The 2006–07 Central Connecticut Blue Devils men's basketball team represented Central Connecticut State University during the 2006–07 NCAA Division I men's basketball season. The Blue Devils were led by 11th-year head coach Howie Dickenman, and played their home games at the William H. Detrick Gymnasium in New Britain, Connecticut as members of the Northeast Conference. After finishing atop the conference regular season standings, the Blue Devils also won the Northeast Conference tournament to receive the conferencess automatic bid to the NCAA Division I men's tournament. An No. 16 seed in the South region, Central Connecticut fell to No. 1 seed Ohio State, 78–57, to finish the season with a record of 22–12 (16–2 NEC).

Roster 

Source

Schedule and results

|-
!colspan=12 style=| Regular season

|-
!colspan=12 style=| NEC Tournament

|-
!colspan=12 style=| NCAA Tournament

Source

References

Central Connecticut Blue Devils men's basketball seasons
Central Connecticut Blue Devils
Central Connecticut
Central Connecticut Blue Devils men's basketball team
Central Connecticut Blue Devils men's basketball team